
This is a list of high schools in the state of Maryland.

Allegany County

Allegany County Public Schools

 Mountain Ridge High School, Frostburg
 Center for Career & Technical Education, Cresaptown

Cumberland

 Allegany High School
 Fort Hill High School

Allegany County non-public schools

 Bishop Walsh School, Cumberland
 Calvary Christian Academy, Cresaptown

Anne Arundel County

Anne Arundel County Public Schools

 Arundel High School, Gambrills
Chesapeake Science Point Charter School, Hanover
Crofton High School, Crofton
 Mary E. Moss Academy, Crownsville
 Meade Senior High School, Fort Meade
 Old Mill High School, Millersville
 Severna Park High School, Severna Park
 South River High School, Edgewater
 Southern High School, Harwood

Annapolis

 Annapolis High School
 Broadneck High School
Phoenix Academy

Glen Burnie

 Glen Burnie High School
 North County High School

Pasadena

 Chesapeake High School
 Northeast Senior High School

Anne Arundel County non-public schools

Arundel Christian School, Hanover
 Indian Creek School, Crownsville
Odenton Christian School, Odenton
 Severn School, Severna Park

Annapolis

 The Key School
 St. Mary's High School

Glen Burnie

Calvary Baptist Church Academy
Granite Baptist School

Severn

 Annapolis Area Christian School
 Archbishop Spalding High School

Baltimore City

Baltimore City Public Schools (Alternative)

 Achievement Academy at Harbor City High School
 Baltimore Career Academy
 Eager Street Academy
 Excel Academy at Francis M. Wood High School
 Success Academy
 Youth Opportunity Academy

Baltimore City Public Schools (Charter)

 Baltimore Design School
 Baltimore Leadership School for Young Women
 Bard High School Early College Baltimore
 City Neighbors High School
 ConneXions: A Community Based Arts School
 Coppin Academy High School
 Green Street Academy
 Independence School Local I High School
 The Reach! Partnership School

Baltimore City Public Schools (Choice Lottery)

 Academy for College and Career Exploration
 Augusta Fells Savage Institute of Visual Arts
 Bluford Drew Jemison STEM Academy West
 Digital Harbor High School
 Forest Park High School
 Frederick Douglass High School
 Mergenthaler Vocational-Technical High School
 National Academy Foundation High School
 New Era Academy
 Patterson High School
 Paul Laurence Dunbar High School
 Reginald F. Lewis High School
 Renaissance Academy
 Vivien T. Thomas Medical Arts Academy

Baltimore City Public Schools (Specialized)

 Baltimore City College
 Baltimore Polytechnic Institute
 Baltimore School for the Arts
 Carver Vocational Technical High School
 Edmondson-Westside High School
 Western High School

Baltimore City non-public schools

Catholic Schools

 Archbishop Curley High School
 The Catholic High School of Baltimore
 Cristo Rey Jesuit High School
 Institute of Notre Dame
 Mercy High School
 Mount Saint Joseph College High School
 St. Frances Academy
 Seton Keough High School

Other Religious Schools

 Friends School of Baltimore (Quaker)
 Greater Grace Christian Academy (non-denominational Christian)

Non-sectarian Independent Schools

 Boys' Latin School of Maryland
 Bryn Mawr School
 The Community School
 Gilman School
 Lab School of Baltimore
 Maryland School for the Blind
 Park School of Baltimore
 Roland Park Country School

Baltimore County

Baltimore County Public Schools

 Catonsville High School, Catonsville
 Dulaney High School, Timonium
 Dundalk High School, Dundalk
 Franklin High School, Reiserstown
 Hereford High School, Parkton
 Loch Raven High School, Towson
 New Town High School, Owings Mills
 Owings Mills High School, Owings Mills
 Perry Hall High School, Perry Hall
 Pikesville High School, Pikesville

Magnet Schools

 Carver Center for Arts and Technology, Towson
 Chesapeake High School, Essex
 Eastern Technical High School, Essex
 Kenwood High School, Essex
 Lansdowne High School, Halethorpe
 Milford Mill Academy, Milford Mill
 Overlea High School, Baltimore
 Parkville High School, Parkville
 Patapsco High School, Dundalk
 Randallstown High School, Randallstown
 Sollers Point Technical High School, Dundalk
 Sparrows Point High School, Sparrows Point
 Towson High School, Towson
 Western School of Technology and Environmental Science, Catonsville
 Woodlawn High School, Baltimore

Baltimore County non-public schools
 Al-Rahmah School, Catonsville (Islamic)

Non-sectarian/Independent schools

 Calvert Hall College High School, Towson
 Garrison Forest School, Owings Mills
 Jemicy School, Owings Mills
 McDonogh School, Owings Mills
 Mt. Zion Preparatory Academy, Lanham
 Oldfields School, Glencoe
 The Park School, Brooklandville

Catholic Schools

 Loyola Blakefield, Towson
 Maryvale Preparatory School, Brooklandville
 Mount de Sales Academy, Catonsville 
 Notre Dame Preparatory School, Towson
 Our Lady of Mount Carmel School, Essex 
 Towson Catholic High School, Towson

Christian schools

 Arlington Baptist High School, Baltimore (Baptist)
 Concordia Preparatory School, Towson (Lutheran)
 Perry Hall Christian School, Perry Hall (non-denominational)
 St. Paul's School, Brooklandville (Episcopal)
 St. Paul's School for Girls, Brooklandville (Episcopal)
 St. Timothy's School, Stevenson (Episcopal)

Jewish Schools

Bais Yaakov of Baltimore, Baltimore/Owings Mills
 Beth Tfiloh Dahan Community School, Pikesville
 Israel Henry Beren High School, Pikesville
 Talmudical Academy of Baltimore, Pikesville

Calvert County

Calvert County Public Schools

 Calvert High School, Prince Frederick
 Huntingtown High School, Huntingtown
 Northern High School, Owings
 Patuxent High School, Lusby

Calvert County non-public schools
 The Calverton School, Huntingtown

Caroline County 
 Colonel Richardson High School, Federalsburg

Ridgely 

 Career & Technology Center
 North Caroline High School

Carroll County

Carroll County Public Schools 

 Francis Scott Key High School, Union Bridge
 Liberty High School, Eldersburg
 Manchester Valley High School, Manchester

Sykesville

 Century High School
 South Carroll High School

Westminster

 Carroll County Career and Technology Center 
 Westminster Senior High School
 Winters Mill High School

Carroll County non-public schools

 Carroll Christian Schools, Westminster
 Gerstell Academy, Finksburg
 Silver Oak Academy, Keymar

Cecil County

Cecil County Public Schools

 Bohemia Manor High School, Chesapeake City
 Perryville High School, Perryville

Elkton

 Cecil County School of Technology
 Elkton High School

North East

 North East High School
 Rising Sun High School

Cecil County Private Schools

 Tri-State Christian Academy, Elkton
 Tome School, North East
 West Nottingham Academy, Colora

Charles County

Charles County Public Schools

 Henry E. Lackey High School, Indian Head
 La Plata High School, La Plata
 Maurice J. McDonough High School, Pomfret
 North Point High School, Waldorf
 St. Charles High School, Waldorf
 Thomas Stone High School, Waldorf
 Westlake High School, Waldorf

Charles County non-public schools

 Grace Christian Academy, Waldorf
 Southern Maryland Christian Academy, White Plains

Dorchester County

Dorchester County Public Schools
North Dorchester High School, Hurlock

Cambridge

 Cambridge-South Dorchester High School
Dorchester County School of Technology

Frederick County

Frederick County Public Schools

 Brunswick High School, Brunswick
 Catoctin High School, Thurmont
 Middletown High School, Middletown
 Oakdale High School, New Market
 Urbana High School, Ijamsville
 Walkersville High School, Walkersville

Frederick

 Frederick High School
 Governor Thomas Johnson High School
 Linganore High School
 Tuscarora High School

Frederick County non-public schools

 Friends Meeting School, Ijamsville
 St. John's Catholic Prep, Buckeystown

Frederick

 Frederick Christian Academy
 Maryland School for the Deaf
 New Life Christian School

Garrett County

Northern Garrett High School, Accident
Southern Garrett High School, Oakland

Harford County

Harford County Public Schools

 Aberdeen High School, Aberdeen
 Edgewood High School, Edgewood
 Fallston High School, Fallston
 Havre De Grace High School, Havre De Grace
 Joppatowne High School, Joppatowne
 North Harford High School, Pylesville

Bel Air

 Bel Air High School
 C. Milton Wright High School
 Harford Technical High School
 Patterson Mill High School

Harford County non-public schools

 Bethel Christian Academy, Havre De Grace
 Harford Christian School, Darlington
 New Covenant Christian School, Abingdon

Bel Air

 The Highlands School
 The John Carroll School

Howard County

Howard County Public Schools

 Atholton High School, Columbia
 Centennial High School, Ellicott City
 Glenelg High School, Glenelg
 Hammond High School, Columbia
 Howard High School, Columbia
 Long Reach High School, Columbia
 Marriotts Ridge High School, Marriottsville
 Mount Hebron High School, Ellicott City
 Oakland Mills High School, Columbia
 Reservoir High School, Fulton
 River Hill High School, Clarksville
 Wilde Lake High School, Columbia

Howard County non-public schools

 Atholton Adventist Academy, Columbia
 Chapelgate Christian Academy, Marriottsville
 Glenelg Country School, Glenelg

Kent County
Kent County High School, Worton

Montgomery County

Montgomery County Public Schools

 Bethesda-Chevy Chase High School, Bethesda
 Montgomery Blair High School, Silver Spring
 James Hubert Blake High School, Silver Spring
 Winston Churchill High School, Potomac
 Clarksburg High School, Clarksburg
 Damascus High School, Damascus
 Albert Einstein High School, Kensington
 Gaithersburg High School, Gaithersburg
 Walter Johnson High School, Bethesda
 John F. Kennedy High School, Silver Spring
 Col. Zadok Magruder High School, Rockville
 Richard Montgomery High School, Rockville
 Northwest High School, Germantown
 Northwood High School, Silver Spring
 Paint Branch High School, Burtonsville
 Poolesville High School, Poolesville
 Quince Orchard High School, Gaithersburg
 Rockville High School, Rockville
 Seneca Valley High School, Germantown
 Sherwood High School, Sandy Spring
 Springbrook High School, Silver Spring
 Watkins Mill High School, Gaithersburg
 Wheaton High School, Silver Spring
 Walt Whitman High School, Bethesda
 Thomas S. Wootton High School, Rockville

Part-time technical schools

 Thomas Edison High School of Technology, Silver Spring

Montgomery County non-public schools

Non-denominational Independent Schools

 The Barrie School, Silver Spring
 The Bullis School, Potomac
 German International School Washington D.C., Potomac
 The Heights School, Potomac
 Holton-Arms School, Bethesda
 Landon School, Bethesda
 McLean School of Maryland, Potomac
 Nora School, Silver Spring
 Rochambeau French International School, Bethesda
 Sandy Spring Friends School, Sandy Spring
 The Siena School, Silver Spring
 Thornton Friends School, Silver Spring
 Washington Waldorf School, Bethesda

Catholic Schools

 Academy of the Holy Cross, Kensington
 The Avalon School, Wheaton
 Brookewood School, Kensington
 Connelly School of the Holy Child, Potomac
 Don Bosco Cristo Rey High School, Takoma Park
 Georgetown Preparatory School, Rockville
 Our Lady of Good Counsel High School, Olney
 Stone Ridge School of the Sacred Heart, Bethesda

Other Religious Schools

 Charles E. Smith Jewish Day School,  Rockville
 Covenant Life School, Gaithersburg
 Melvin J. Berman Hebrew Academy, Rockville
 The Muslim Community School, Potomac
 St. Andrew's Episcopal School, Potomac
 Spencerville Adventist Academy, Silver Spring
 Takoma Academy, Takoma Park
 Washington Christian Academy, Silver Spring
 Yeshiva of Greater Washington, Silver Spring

Prince George's County

Prince George's County Public Schools

 Bladensburg High School, Bladensburg
 Bowie High School, Bowie
 Charles Herbert Flowers High School, Springdale
 Crossland High School, Temple Hills
 DuVal High School, Lanham
 Eleanor Roosevelt High School, Greenbelt
 Friendly High School, Fort Washington
 Gwynn Park High School, Brandywine
 High Point High School, Beltsville
 Laurel High School, Laurel
 Northwestern High School, Hyattsville
 Parkdale High School, Riverdale
 Surrattsville High School, Clinton

Capitol Heights

 Central High School
 Fairmont Heights High School

Forestville

 Forestville Military Academy
 Suitland High School

Largo

 Academy of Health Sciences at Prince George's Community College
 Largo High School

Oxon Hill

 Oxon Hill High School
 Potomac High School

Upper Marlboro

 Frederick Douglass High School
 Dr. Henry A. Wise Jr. High School

Prince George's County non-public schools

Al Huda School, College Park
 Belair Baptist Christian Academy, Bowie
 Bishop McNamara High School, Forestville
 Elizabeth Seton High School, Bladensburg
 From the Heart Christian School, Suitland
 Lanham Christian School, Lanham
 National Christian Academy, Fort Washington
 New Hope Academy, Landover Hills
 St. Vincent Pallotti High School, Laurel

Clinton

 Grace Brethren Christian School
 Independent Baptist Academy

Hyattsville

 Chelsea School
 DeMatha Catholic High School

Upper Marlboro

 Fairhaven School
 Riverdale Baptist School

Queen Anne's County

Queen Anne's County Public Schools

 Kent Island High School, Stevensville
 Queen Anne's County High School, Centreville

Queen Anne's County non-public schools

 Gunston Day School, Centreville
 Wye River Upper School, Centreville

St. Mary's County

St. Mary's County Public Schools 

 Chopticon High School, Morganza
 Great Mills High School, Great Mills
 Leonardtown High School, Leonardtown

St. Mary's County non-public schools
 The King's Christian Academy, Callaway

Leonardtown

 Leonard Hall Junior Naval Academy
 St. Mary's Ryken High School

Somerset County

Somerset County Public Schools

 Crisfield High School, Crisfield
 Washington High School, Princess Anne

Somerset County non-public schools
 Holly Grove Christian School, Westover

Talbot County

Talbot County Public Schools

 Easton High School, Easton
 St. Michaels Middle/High School, St. Michaels

Talbot County non-public schools

 Chesapeake Christian School, Easton
 Saints Peter and Paul School, Easton

Washington County

Washington County Public Schools

 Boonsboro High School, Boonsboro
 Clear Spring High School, Clear Spring
 Hancock High School, Hancock
 Smithsburg High School, Smithsburg
 Williamsport High School, Williamsport

Hagerstown

 Antietam Academy
 Barbara Ingram School for the Arts
 Evening High School
 North Hagerstown High School
 South Hagerstown High School
 Washington County Technical High School

Washington County non-public schools
 St. James School, St. James

Hagerstown

 Broadfording Academy
 Emmanuel Christian School
 Grace Academy
 Heritage Academy
 Highland View Academy
 St. Maria Goretti High School
 Truth Christian Academy

Wicomico County

Wicomico County Public Schools
 Mardela Middle and High School, Mardela Springs

Salisbury

 James M. Bennett High School
 Parkside High School
 Wicomico High School

Wicomico County non-public schools

 Faith Baptist School, Salisbury
 The Salisbury School, Salisbury
 Salisbury Christian School, Salisbury

Worcester County

Worcester County Public Schools

 Pocomoke High School, Pocomoke City
 Snow Hill High School, Snow Hill
 Stephen Decatur High School, Berlin
 Worcester Technical High School, Newark

Worcester County non-public schools
 Worcester Preparatory School, Berlin

See also
 List of school districts in Maryland

References

External links
 
 List of high schools in Maryland from SchoolTree.org

Maryland
High
Public high schools in Maryland